The Sanderling Beach Club is a historic Sarasota School of Architecture building in Sarasota, Florida, United States.  It was designed in 1952 by architect Paul Rudolph.

The club is located at 7400 Sanderling Road, Sarasota. On June 29, 1994, it was added to the U.S. National Register of Historic Places.

Construction 
The roof of each structure consists of a series of low vaulted ceilings, constructed of two thin layers of plywood sheathing.  The general contractor for Sanderling was James Stroud, who built other Rudolph projects such as the 1957 Harkavy Residence and the 1953 Davis Residence.

References

External links
 Sarasota County listings at National Register of Historic Places
 Sarasota History Timeline (1940 - 1970)
 The Sanderling Club's Story
 Paul Rudolph: The Florida Houses by Christopher Domin and Joseph King

International style architecture in Florida
National Register of Historic Places in Sarasota County, Florida
Buildings and structures in Sarasota, Florida
Modernist architecture in Florida
1952 establishments in Florida